Dolores Jean Moran (January 27, 1926 – February 5, 1982) was an American film actress and model.

Early years
Moran was born named Jaqueline in Stockton, California, the daughter of James G. Moran and his wife, Esther Moran and attended elementary and secondary schools there. She won the Northern California Oratorical Contest and starred in school plays.

Film career
In 1942, aged 16, Moran, was signed by Warner Bros. to a seven-year contract, with her parents' permission.

Moran's brief career as a film actress began with uncredited roles in such films as Yankee Doodle Dandy (1942) as "the Pippirino" (with whom George blows off a date to go out with Mary). By 1943, she had become a pin-up girl appearing on the cover of such magazines as Yank. She was given supporting roles in films, such as Old Acquaintance (1943) with Bette Davis.

Warner Bros. attempted to increase interest in her, promoting her along with Lauren Bacall as a new screen personality when Bacall was cast alongside Humphrey Bogart in To Have and Have Not (1944). The film made a star of Bacall, but Moran languished, and subsequent films did little to further her career.

The Horn Blows at Midnight (1945) gave her a leading role with Jack Benny and Alexis Smith, but her film appearances after this were sporadic, and she suffered ill health that reduced her ability to work. Her film career ended in 1954 with a featured role in the John Payne and Lizabeth Scott western film Silver Lode.

Personal life
She married film producer Benedict Bogeaus in Salome, Arizona in 1946. Their son Brett Benedict became a businessman. They divorced in 1962;

Moran had an affair with director Howard Hawks while filming To Have and Have Not, which Hawks undertook mainly as revenge for his rejection by Bacall in favor of Bogart. Bacall chided Bogart in one scene where she copied one of Moran's lines and fluttered her eyes at Bogart to emphasize how corny she thought Moran's acting skills were.

In 1968, Moran was the recipient of bequest valued at $300,000 (worth nearly $2.5 million in 2022 dollars ). Anthony Ponce, "a recluse apricot grower", bequeathed the bulk of his estate to her because he appreciated her kindness 20 years earlier when she worked as a carhop at a drive-in. Ponce's will directed that $6,000 go to his nephew and five nieces, with the rest to go to Moran. The nieces and nephew contested the will.

Death
In 1982, Dolores Moran died of cancer, aged 56.

Filmography

References

External links

1926 births
1982 deaths
20th-century American actresses
American film actresses
Female models from California
People from Stockton, California
Warner Bros. contract players
People from Woodland Hills, Los Angeles
Deaths from lung cancer in California